Duniya Kya Jaane is a 1971 Indian Hindi-language romantic drama film directed by Sridhar. It was simultaneously shot in Tamil as Avalukendru Or Manam, both versions starring Bharathi. The film was a box-office bomb.

Plot

Cast 
 Bharathi
 Premendra
 Anupama
 Manmohan

Production 
Duniya Kya Jaane was simultaneously shot in Tamil as Avalukendru Or Manam. While choosing established actors in Tamil, Sridhar cast newcomers in Hindi to keep the budget lower, though Bharathi appeared in both versions.

Soundtrack 
The music was composed by Shankar–Jaikishan.

Reception 
The film was a box-office bomb, running for hardly two weeks in Bombay theatres.

References

External links 
 

1970s Hindi-language films
1971 romantic drama films
Films directed by C. V. Sridhar
Films scored by Shankar–Jaikishan
Indian romantic drama films